SS A. B. Hammond was a liberty ship built by California Shipbuilding Corporation of Los Angeles, and delivered in February 1944, to the War Shipping Administration (WSA).

SS A. B. Hammond is named after Andrew B. Hammond, owner of the Hammond Lumber Company and Hammond Shipping Co. Ltd. During World War II Hammond Shipping Company was active in charter shipping with the Maritime Commission and War Shipping Administration. The ship was run by its Hammond Shipping Company crew and the US Navy supplied United States Navy Armed Guards to man the deck guns and radio. Hammond Shipping Co. Ltd. operated both Liberty and Victory ships.

In 1947 the War Shipping Administration sold the ship for private use. She was scrapped in 1963, following grounding damage.

Names and flags
1947 – Renamed "MARIO II" by Constantine Koniadlidis of Montevideo – Uruguay flag
1948 – Renamed "ENSENADA" by Cia de Nav, of Ensenada, Panama (S. G. Embiricos, London)
1959 – Renamed "CESTOS" Zenith Transportation Corporation, of Liberia Flag, (Fratelli Delfino, Genoa)
1961 – Renamed "NICOLAOS TSAVLIRIS" Nigean Shipping Company, of Panama – Greek flag (Tsavliris Maritime Company, Piraeus)
1963 – Scrapped – Turkey after grounding damage at Kilyos, Black Sea.

References

 

1944 ships
Liberty ships
Ships built in Los Angeles